Gerald Joseph Cuthbert Harrison (1895 – 6 December 1954) was Conservative MP for Bodmin.

Educated at Charterhouse School and Exeter College, Oxford, Harrison  During the First World War, he was commissioned into the Royal Field Artillery and saw service with the 3rd Lowland Brigade, 52nd Lowland Division and with Egyptian Expeditionary Force in Sinai, Palestine, and Syria. He was demobilized in 1919 with the rank of captain.

He was elected for Bodmin in 1924, taking the seat from the Liberal Isaac Foot. From 1926 to 1929, he was Parliamentary Private Secretary to the First Lord of the Admiralty. He was defeated by Foot at the 1929 general election.

Harrison was High Sheriff of Cumberland for 1945–46 and Deputy Lieutenant for Cumberland from 1953.

Sources

 
 

Conservative Party (UK) MPs for English constituencies
Members of the Parliament of the United Kingdom for Bodmin
1895 births
1954 deaths
People educated at Charterhouse School
Alumni of Exeter College, Oxford
Royal Field Artillery officers
British Army personnel of World War I
High Sheriffs of Cumberland
Deputy Lieutenants of Cumberland